Mozilla Firefox 3.6 is a version of the Firefox web browser released in January 2010. The release's main improvement over Firefox 3.5 is improved performance (due to further speed improvements in the TraceMonkey JavaScript engine). It uses the Gecko 1.9.2 engine (compared to 1.9.1 in Fx 3.5), which improves compliance with web standards. It was codenamed Namoroka. In this version, support for X BitMap images was dropped.

This release marked the beginning of a new development cycle for Firefox. As well as receiving major updates, the browser also received minor updates with new features. This was to allow users to receive new features more quickly and the dawn of a new roadmap that reflected these changes.

It was superseded by Firefox 4, released the next year, although Fx 3.6 had a prolonged period of use and version 4 had noted user interface changes. Firefox 3.6 is the last major version of an official Firefox release to run on PowerPC-based Macintoshes (see TenFourFox for a much-more-recent version of Firefox for PowerPC-based computers running Mac OS X).  Soon after 4, much less weight was given to major version numbers, with 6 numbers used by September of that year (4, 5, 6, 7, 8, and 9) compared to 3 in nearly a decade of Firefox development (1, 2 and 3).

Firefox versions 4 through 9 had all reached end-of-life status while Mozilla continued supporting Firefox 3.6 with security updates. Coinciding with a proposal to cater to Enterprise users with optional Extended Support Releases beginning in 2012 based upon Firefox 10, Mozilla discontinued support for Firefox 3.6 on April 24, 2012  with automatic update to Firefox 12 pushed out to compatible devices by June 2012.

Development 
Development for this version started on December 1, 2008. The first alpha of version 3.6 was released on August 7, 2009. The first beta version was released on October 30, followed by Beta 2 on November 10, Beta 3 on November 17, Beta 4 on November 26, and Beta 5 on December 17. Release Candidate 1 was released on January 8, 2010, followed by Release Candidate 2 on January 17. The final version was released on January 21, 2010.

Minor releases 

Firefox 3.6.2 was released on March 23, 2010, followed by version 3.6.3 on April 1 which closed some bugs in the ASLR and DEP handling found at the Pwn2Own contest 2010.

The Firefox developers created a new feature called Lorentz. It is named after the Lorentz National Park. A preview version of Lorentz, Firefox 3.6.3plugin1, was made available on April 8, 2010. Betas of Firefox 3.6.4 were made available starting on April 20, 2010. Firefox 3.6.4 was released on June 22, 2010. The Windows and Linux versions incorporate out-of-process plug-ins (OOPP), which isolates execution of plug-ins (Adobe Flash, Apple QuickTime and Microsoft Silverlight by default) into a separate process. This significantly reduces the number of Firefox crashes experienced by users who are watching online videos or playing games; the user can simply refresh the page to continue. Mozilla states that 30% of browser crashes are caused by third-party plugins.

Support for other plug-ins by default in OOPP and on the Mac OS X platform became available in Firefox 4.

Firefox 3.6.6 lengthens the amount of time a plug-in is allowed to be unresponsive to the point before the plug-in quits.

Firefox 3.6.7 was a security and stability update that fixed several issues.

Firefox 3.6.8 was a security update that was released a mere three days after 3.6.7, to fix another security fault.

Firefox 3.6.9, in addition to fixing security and stability issues, introduced support for the X-FRAME-OPTIONS HTTP response header to help prevent clickjacking.

Firefox 3.6.10 was a security and stability update that fixed several issues.

Firefox 3.6.11 was a security and stability update that fixed several issues.

Firefox 3.6.12 was a security update that fixed a critical security issue.

Firefox 3.6.13 was a security and stability update that fixed several issues.

Firefox 3.6.14 was a security and stability update that fixed several issues.

Firefox 3.6.15 was a stability update that fixed a Java applets issue.

Firefox 3.6.16 was a security update that blacklisted a few invalid HTTPS certificates.

Firefox 3.6.17 was a security and stability update that fixed several issues.

Firefox 3.6.18 was a security and stability update that fixed several issues.

Firefox 3.6.19 was a stability update that fixed several issues.

Firefox 3.6.20 was a security and stability update that fixed several issues.

Firefox 3.6.21 was a security update that blacklisted a compromised HTTPS certificate.

Firefox 3.6.22 was a security update that revoked the SSL certificates for "Staten der Nederlanden" due to fraudulent SSL certificate issuance, as well as fixing an error with .gov.uk domain names.

Firefox 3.6.23 was a security and stability update that fixed several issues.

Firefox 3.6.24 was a security and stability update that fixed several issues.

Firefox 3.6.25 was a security and stability update that fixed several issues.

Firefox 3.6.26 was a security and stability update that fixed several issues.

Firefox 3.6.27 was a security update that fixed several issues.

Firefox 3.6.28 is a security and stability update that fixed several issues.

Features 

New features for Firefox 3.6 include
 Built-in support for Personas (browser Graphical user interface themes)
 Check and notification of out-of-date plugins
 Full-screen playback of Theora video
 Support for the WOFF open web font format
 Plug-in directory lock down: Plugins may only to be installed using a .xpi file, not through mere copying to the Firefox plugin directory. This breaks older plugins such as the Java Runtime Environment before 6 Update 15,. net framework before 1.2.
 Many performance improvements

End of life 
Mozilla discontinued support for Firefox 3.6 on April 24, 2012, which at over 27 months of support made it the longest supported version of Firefox, even longer than Firefox 2 which had over 26 months of total support itself. The underlying Gecko 1.9.2 engine continued to be used, with updates, in Camino.

See also 
 History of Firefox

References

External links 
 Mozilla Firefox 3.6 Release Notes
 Mozilla Firefox 3.6.28 Download link (FTP)
 Mozilla.com, Mozilla Firefox homepage for end-users
 Mozilla.org, Mozilla Firefox project page for developers
 Mozilla.com, Mozilla EULA
 Nightly.Mozilla.org, Firefox latest builds

3.6
2010 software
Free software programmed in C++
FTP clients
Gopher clients
History of web browsers
Linux web browsers
MacOS web browsers
POSIX web browsers
Unix Internet software
Windows web browsers
Software that uses XUL

es:Anexo:Historia de Mozilla Firefox#Firefox 3.6